Joan Garriga Vilaresau (29 March 1963 – 27 August 2015) was a Spanish Grand Prix motorcycle road racer. He was known for his aggressive riding style. Together with Sito Pons, he helped to forge the path for Spanish riders in the World Championship’s premier class.

Garriga had his best year in 1988, when he won three races and finished second in the 250cc world championship to Pons. In 1990, he moved up to the 500cc class but failed to repeat his successes in the 250 class. He also competed in the Superbike World Championship in 1993.

In 1998, Garriga was arrested for drug trafficking and possessing illegal weapons, and ultimately sentenced to two years' imprisonment, suspended. Court-obtained medical records showed that he had been regularly taking drugs during his motorcycle-racing career.

Garriga died due to injuries suffered in a motorcycle road accident in August 2015.

Motorcycle Grand Prix results
Points system from 1969 to 1987:

Points system from 1988 to 1992:

(key) (Races in bold indicate pole position; races in italics indicate fastest lap)

References 

1963 births
2015 deaths
Motorcycle racers from Catalonia
Spanish motorcycle racers
250cc World Championship riders
500cc World Championship riders
Superbike World Championship riders
Spanish drug traffickers
Road incident deaths in Spain